Jérôme Hiaumet (born 12 April 1979) is a French retired professional football player.

Career
Born in Alençon, Hiaumet began playing club football as a goalkeeper with Stade Malherbe Caen. He only made one Ligue 2 appearance for the senior side before joining Stade Lavallois in 2001.

Hiaumet won the 1997 UEFA European Under-18 Championship with France.

References

External links
 
 

1979 births
Living people
French footballers
France youth international footballers
Ligue 2 players
Stade Malherbe Caen players
Stade Lavallois players
FC Sète 34 players
AS Cannes players
Angers SCO players
Sportspeople from Alençon
Association football goalkeepers
Footballers from Normandy